Lü Xilin (born January 1955) is a Chinese engineer specializing in concrete structures, prestressed structures and aseismic structures.

Biography
In September 1974, he entered the Xi'an Institute of Metallurgical Architecture (now Xi'an University of Architecture and Technology), where he graduated in August 1978. Then he earned his M.Eng. degree from Tongji University in 1984 under the supervision of Zhu Bolong. He is the first doctor of engineering trained after the establishment of Tongji University. 

In 1991 he became a visiting scholar at the University of Alberta and then University of Hong Kong. He returned to China in 1991 and joined the faculty of Tongji University. Four days after the 2008 Sichuan earthquake, he left for Sichuan with a team of six experts of Tongji University from Shanghai, as the "Expert Group of Housing Emergency Assessment" sent by the Ministry of Construction, to assess the disaster of houses in Guangyuan, Qingchuan County and Cangxi County.

Honours and awards
 2000 National Science Fund for Distinguished Young Scholars 
 2006 State Science and Technology Progress Award (Second Class) 
 2009 State Science and Technology Progress Award (Second Class) 
 2014 State Technological Invention Award (Second Class)
 November 2015 Engineering Construction Technology Award of the Ho Leung Ho Lee Foundation 
 April 2017 Nathan M. Newmark Medal of the American Society of Civil Engineers (ASCE)
 November 22, 2019 Member of the Chinese Academy of Engineering (CAE)

References

1955 births
Living people
People from Qishan County
Engineers from Shaanxi
Xi'an University of Architecture and Technology alumni
Tongji University alumni
Academic staff of Tongji University
Members of the Chinese Academy of Engineering